Mind over matter is a popular phrase with paranormal, spiritual, and philosophical uses.

Mind over Matter may also refer to:

Music
 Mind over Matter (band), an Australian hip hop duo

Albums
 Mind over Matter (The Nightingales album), 2015
 Mind over Matter (Young the Giant album) or the title song, 2014
 Mind over Matter (Zion I album), 2000
 Mind over Matter, by George Bellas, accompanied by Deen Castronovo and Matt Guillory, 1998
 Mind over Matter, by Mark Shim, 1998
 Mind over Matter, by Mark Williams, 1992
 Mind over Matter, a comedy album, or the musical title track, by Robert Klein, 1974

Songs
 "Mind over Matter" (E. G. Daily song), 1987
 "Mind over Matter", composed by the Sherman Brothers for the film Winnie the Pooh and the Honey Tree, 1966
 "Mind over Matter", by Ice-T from O.G. Original Gangster
 "Mind over Matter", by Iron Savior from Unification

Television episodes
 "Mind over Matter" (Birds of a Feather)
 "Mind over Matter" (The Outer Limits)